Kashmiri Gate may refer to:
 Kashmiri Gate, Delhi, the northern gate to Walled City of Delhi, also known as Shahjahanabad or Old Delhi
 Kashmiri Gate, Lahore, one of the thirteen gates of the Walled City of Lahore

See also
 Delhi Gate (disambiguation)
 Lahori Gate (disambiguation)